Ballads 'n' Bullets is the first studio album by In Legend, a band from vocalist and pianist Bastian Emig, mostly known as the drummer from the German a cappella metal band Van Canto.

Track listing

Personnel

In Legend 
Bastian Emig – drums, lyrics, music, piano, producer, vocals, mastering, mixing, programming
Daniel Wicke – bass guitar
Dennis Otto – drums

Guest musicians 
Inga Scharf (Van Canto) – female vocals (10)

Crew 
Jens Arndt – photography
Charlie Bauerfeind – drum engineering
Andrea Friedrich – photography
Marcus Küsters – photography
Jürgen Lusky – mastering, mixing
Robert Naumann – cover layout, layout
Stefan Schmidt – producer
Jasmin Stierli – photography

References 

2011 albums
In Legend albums